U.S. Route 224 (US 224) is a spur of US 24 that runs through the states of Indiana, Ohio and Pennsylvania. It goes through the cities of Canfield, Ohio, Akron, Ohio, and Findlay, Ohio. In Northeast Ohio, US 224 is located a short distance north of the Western Reserve's southern boundary.

Route description

Indiana

From the western terminus at US 24, US 224 heads southeast concurrent with State Road 5 (SR 5).  US 224 and SR 5 heads through downtown Huntington as one-way streets, with eastbound on Cherry Street and State Street and westbound on Warren Street.  From downtown US 224 and SR 5 head southeast then outside of downtown SR 5 heads due south and US 224 heads east.  US 224 passes through Markle where US 224 has an interchange with Interstate 69 (I-69) and intersections with both SR 116 and SR 3.  US 224 heads east towards Decatur passing through intersections with SR 301 and SR 1.  In Decatur US 224 has a short concurrency with US 27 and US 33.  US 224 heads east from Decatur towards Ohio passing through a short concurrency with SR 101.

The only section of U.S. Route 224 in Indiana that is included in the National Highway System is the part concurrent with US 27 and US 33. Traffic reports from the Indiana Department of Transportation in 2010 showed that the lowest traffic levels were the 2,420 vehicles and 670 commercial vehicles using the highway daily near the Ohio state line; the highest traffic levels were the 21,680 vehicles and 1,690 commercial vehicles traveling along the section of US 224 that is concurrent with US 27 and US 33.

Ohio
West of its concurrency with US 42 near Lodi, US 224 is a rural arterial highway, mostly two lanes, across western Ohio. It runs roughly parallel to the former Baltimore and Ohio Railroad from its westerly US 42 junction to Tiffin, a city around which it sweeps to the south with intersections at various state highways that radiate out from downtown. US 224 passes through a commercial strip on the south side of Willard, and goes through downtown Findlay and Ottawa, but it otherwise specializes in small towns along its course across northwest Ohio. It crosses US 250 east of Greenwich; State Route 4 (SR 4), a major north–south route, at Attica; US 23 south of Fostoria, and I-75 in Findlay, and has brief concurrences with US 127 and US 30 near Van Wert. It crosses the Ashland Railway just east of Willard, the Norfolk Southern Railway at Attica, CSX Transportation near US 23, in Findlay, and in Ottawa, and the Chicago, Fort Wayne and Eastern Railroad west of Van Wert.

East of Lodi, US 224 meets the western terminus of I-76, with which it forms a concurrency. It is in this area, US 224 enters the Connecticut Western Reserve. Less than a mile later, both routes intersect with I-71. US 224 continues along with I-76 to Akron. Here, I-76 exits and heads north. Continuing on US 224, the route runs concurrently with I-277, a short auxiliary highway running through southern Akron. I-277 quickly ends, leaving US 224 to continue into a heavily wooded area. The highway then intersects with SR 43, SR 44, SR 169, SR 225, SR 24, SR 45 and SR 46. Shortly after crossing over SR 11, US 224 enters Boardman Township in Mahoning County. This stretch of US 224, through Canfield, Boardman and Poland, is known for its chronic congestion. The original routing of US 224 through the village of Poland turned southeast on Main Street (formerly SR 90, now SR 170) to Riverside Drive, then north on Riverside Drive to the current alignment. In 1954 a bridge was built across Yellow Creek and a new road was constructed from Main Street to Riverside Drive, including an intersection with Water Street (SR 616). As US 224 leaves the village of Poland it continues through rural terrain as it heads towards Pennsylvania.

Pennsylvania

US 224 crosses into Mahoning Township in Lawrence County and becomes West State Street, a two-lane, undivided road. The road heads through wooded areas with some homes and commercial establishments, heading to the east-southeast. The route curves to the northeast in Peanut and passes over Norfolk Southern's Youngstown Line, coming to an intersection with PA 551. Here, PA 551 turns northeast to form a concurrency with US 224. The road heads through wooded areas and crosses the Mahoning River and CSX's New Castle Subdivision railroad line. PA 551 splits from US 224 by heading north on North Edinburg Road, with US 224 continuing into wooded areas with some farm fields. The road turns to the southeast and enters Union Township. The route continues through wooded areas with some farmland and homes, passing to the south of New Castle Municipal Airport and heading through the community of Parkstown. US 224 heads into commercial areas, gaining a second lane westbound before widening into a six-lane divided highway as it comes to an interchange with I-376/US 422.

Past this interchange, the road becomes a three-lane road with a center left-turn lane and passes through a mix of residences and businesses, running through the community of Oakwood. The route heads into the city of New Castle and passes through wooded areas of development, gaining a second westbound lane and coming to an intersection with US 422 Business. At this point, US 422 Business turns east to join US 224 on four-lane divided West Falls Street, passing more development and crossing over a New Castle Industrial Railroad line and the Shenango River. The road heads to the east and continues through commercial areas. US 224 ends at an intersection with PA 18, at which point US 422 Business turns south to join that route.

History

US 224 was assigned to a portion of the Benjamin Franklin Highway, an auto trail running from Omaha, Nebraska to Philadelphia, Pennsylvania; its number assignment was an alternative to a westward rerouting of US 422 which runs along the Benjamin Franklin Highway farther east.

When US 224 was commissioned in Indiana in 1934, it replaced State Road 16 (SR 16), from Huntington to the Ohio state line.

Although US 224 is only in Pennsylvania for 10 miles, the eastern terminus has changed several times since 1933, ending at various points in New Castle, Pennsylvania or in adjacent Union Township west of the city. The eastern terminus has been moved five times (1936, 1947, 1974, 1977, 2008), the most notable of which was in the 1970s when the New Castle Bypass opened in 1974 and the state extended US 224 through the city and into Shenango Township at the eastern terminus of the bypass, taking over US 422's old alignment after that highway was moved to the bypass.

The route was truncated back at the current interchange with US 422 and I-376 in 1977 while the old alignment through New Castle was replaced by Business US 422. This would be the case until March 20, 2008, when US 224 was officially extended  to PA 18 inside the New Castle city limits with the placement of new signs. The Pennsylvania Department of Transportation (PennDOT) requested approval from the American Association of State Highway and Transportation Officials (AASHTO) for the extension in August 2007. and received it the following month.

The extension of US 224 marked the second extension of a major highway into downtown New Castle in a little more than a year, as Pennsylvania Route 65 was extended a mile from its previous terminus with Business 422 to the PA 108/PA 168 concurrency in February 2007.

Future
Due to a higher-than-average number of crash-related injuries and fatalities along a stretch of US 224 in Medina County, Ohio, the Ohio Department of Transportation (ODOT) recommended converting three intersections, Vandemark, Westfield and Leroy roads, to restricted crossing U-turns. The highest-priority intersection, with Westfield Road in Westfield Township, was awarded $578,000 in ODOT funding and began construction in May 2019 and finished by the end of summer 2019.

There is a $2.4 million project north of the city of Van Wert to replace the current intersection of US 224, US 127 and Marsh Road (County Road 13) with a roundabout. The project began in January 2022 and is expected to be complete in October.

Major intersections

See also

Notes

References

External links

Pennsylvania Highways: US 224
US 224 in Ohio at AARoads.com
US 224 in Pennsylvania at AARoads.com
Ohio Roads - US 224
Pennsylvania Roads - US 224
Endpoints of US 224 at USEnds.com

24-2
24-2
24-2
24-2
2
Transportation in Huntington County, Indiana
Transportation in Wells County, Indiana
Transportation in Adams County, Indiana
Transportation in Van Wert County, Ohio
Transportation in Putnam County, Ohio
Transportation in Hancock County, Ohio
Transportation in Seneca County, Ohio
Transportation in Huron County, Ohio
Transportation in Ashland County, Ohio
Transportation in Medina County, Ohio
Transportation in Summit County, Ohio
Transportation in Portage County, Ohio
Transportation in Mahoning County, Ohio
Transportation in Lawrence County, Pennsylvania